Antônio Roberto Xavier Nascimento (born August 19, 1977) is a Brazilian cyclist.

Major results

2001
 10th Copa América de Ciclismo
2002
 Tour de Santa Catarina
1st Stages 2 & 4
 2nd Prova Ciclística 9 de Julho
2003
 1st Overall Tour de Santa Catarina
1st  Mountains classification
1st Stage 1
2004
 1st  Overall Tour do Brasil
1st  Mountains classification
 2nd Overall Tour de Santa Catarina
1st Stage 6
 6th Copa América de Ciclismo
 10th Overall Volta de Porto Alegre
2005
 1st Stage 5 Tour de Santa Catarina
 2nd Overall Volta do Paraná
1st Stage 2
2006
 1st Stage 7 Tour de Santa Catarina
 1st Mountains classification Volta de Ciclismo Internacional do Estado de São Paulo
 3rd Prova Ciclística 9 de Julho
2009
 1st Stage 3 Volta do Paraná
 2nd Overall Tour de Santa Catarina
2010
 3rd Overall Volta Ciclística Internacional do Rio Grande do Sul
1st  Mountains classification
 5th Overall Tour do Brasil
1st Stage 9
 8th Overall Giro do Interior de São Paulo
1st Stage 1
2011
 3rd Overall Volta Ciclística Internacional do Rio Grande do Sul
1st Stage 2
 5th Overall Tour do Rio
 8th Overall Tour do Brasil
1st Stage 1
2015
 8th Overall Volta do Paraná

References

External links

1977 births
Living people
Brazilian road racing cyclists
Brazilian male cyclists
21st-century Brazilian people
20th-century Brazilian people